Daniel Edward Aykroyd  (born July 1, 1952) is a Canadian actor, comedian, writer, producer, and musician. Aykroyd was a writer and an original member of the "Not Ready for Prime Time Players" cast on the NBC sketch comedy series Saturday Night Live from its inception in 1975 until his departure in 1979. During his tenure on SNL, he appeared in a recurring series of sketches, particularly featuring the Coneheads and the Blues Brothers. For his work on the show, he received five Primetime Emmy Award nominations winning for Outstanding Writing for a Variety Series in 1977. After his departure, he has since returned in guest roles.

Aykroyd gained prominence for writing, and starring as Dr. Raymond "Ray" Stantz in Ghostbusters (1984), and Ghostbusters II (1989) and has reprised his role in various projects within the Ghostbusters franchise. He also is known for his comedic roles in Trading Places (1983), Spies Like Us (1985), Dragnet (1987), Coneheads (1993), The Great Outdoors (1988), The Blues Brothers (1980), and its 1998 sequel.

In 1990, he was nominated for the Academy Award for Best Supporting Actor for his role as Boolie Werthan in Driving Miss Daisy (1989). Other dramatic roles include in My Girl (1991), Chaplin, and Sneakers (both 1992). Aykroyd has done supporting roles in Tommy Boy (1995), Grosse Pointe Blank (1997), 50 First Dates (2004), The Campaign (2012), and Behind the Candelabra (2013).

He starred as Reverend Mike Weber in his own sitcom, Soul Man (1997–1998). He has since appeared on various television shows including It's Garry Shandling's Show (1990), Home Improvement (1997), Family Guy (2009), The Simpsons (2021) and The Conners (2019). Aykroyd is also a businessman, having co-founded the House of Blues chain of music venues and the Crystal Head Vodka brand.

Early life
Aykroyd was born on July 1, 1952, at The Ottawa Hospital in Ottawa, Ontario. His father, Samuel Cuthbert Peter Hugh Aykroyd, a civil engineer, worked as a policy adviser to Canadian Prime Minister Pierre Trudeau, and his mother, Lorraine Hélène Marie (née Gougeon), was a secretary. His mother was of French Canadian descent and his father was of English, Scottish, Irish, French, and Dutch ancestry. His brother, Peter, was also an actor.

He attended St. Pius X and St. Patrick's high schools, and studied criminology and sociology at Carleton University, but dropped out before completing his degree. He worked as a comedian in various Canadian nightclubs and ran an after-hours speakeasy, Club 505, in Toronto for several years.

Aykroyd developed his musical career in Ottawa, particularly through his regular attendances at Le Hibou, a club that featured many blues artists. He describes these influences as follows:

Aykroyd's first professional experience, which he gained at the age of 17, was as a member of the cast of the short-lived Canadian sketch comedy series The Hart and Lorne Terrific Hour with Lorne Michaels, among others. He was a member of the Second City comedy troupe in 1973 in both Toronto and Chicago.

Saturday Night Live
Aykroyd gained fame on the American late-night comedy show Saturday Night Live (SNL). He was originally hired, and paid $278 a week, as a writer for the show, but became a part of the cast before the series premiered. The original cast was referred to on the show as "The Not Ready For Prime Time Players". Aykroyd was the youngest member of the cast, and appeared on the show for its first four seasons, from 1975 to 1979. He brought a sensibility to the show which combined youth, unusual interests, talent as an impersonator, and a manic intensity. Guest host Eric Idle of Monty Python said that Aykroyd's ability to write and act out characters made him the only member of the SNL cast capable of being a Python.

He was known for his impersonations of celebrities such as Jimmy Carter, Vincent Price, Richard Nixon, Rod Serling, Tom Snyder, and Julia Child. He was also known for his recurring roles, such as Beldar, father of the Coneheads family; with Steve Martin, Yortuk Festrunk, one of the "Two Wild and Crazy Guys" brothers from Bratislava, Slovakia; sleazy late-night cable TV host E. Buzz Miller and his cousin, corrupt maker of children's toys and costumes Irwin Mainway (who extolled the virtues and defended the safety of the "Bag-o-Glass" toy); Fred Garvin – male prostitute; and high-bred but low-brow critic Leonard Pinth-Garnell. Aykroyd and Jane Curtin parodied the Point/Counterpoint segment on the CBS news show 60 Minutes, which featured the liberal Shana Alexander and the conservative segregationist James Kilpatrick, by portraying the two as hating one another; Aykroyd's first words in response to Curtin's point were, "Jane, you ignorant slut!".

Aykroyd's eccentric talent was recognized by others in the highly competitive SNL environment; when he first presented his "Super Bass-O-Matic '76" sketch, a fake TV commercial in which a garish, hyper-pitchman (based on Ron Popeil) touts a food blender that turns an entire bass into liquid pulp, the other writers and cast members considered the sketch "so exhilaratingly strange that many remember sitting and listening, open-mouthed ... Nobody felt jealous of it because they couldn't imagine writing anything remotely like it." Aykroyd later said that the inspiration for the sketch was seeing his aunt Helene Gougeon (a culinary writer and food columnist in Montreal) put a bass into a blender in order to make a bouillabaisse when he was 12 years old.

While Aykroyd was a close friend and partner with fellow cast member John Belushi and shared some of the same sensibilities, Aykroyd was more reserved and less self-destructive. Aykroyd later recalled that, unlike Belushi and others of his peers, he was uninterested in recreational drug use.

In 1977, he received an Emmy Award for writing on SNL; he later received two more nominations for writing and one for acting. In Rolling Stones February 2015 appraisal of all 141 SNL cast members to date, Aykroyd was ranked fifth (behind Belushi, Eddie Murphy, Tina Fey, and Mike Myers). "Of all the original [SNL] greats, Aykroyd is the least imitated", they wrote, "because nobody else can do what he did."

In later decades, Aykroyd made occasional guest appearances and unannounced cameos on SNL, often impersonating the American politician Bob Dole. He also brought back past characters including Irwin Mainway and Leonard Pinth-Garnell. In 1995, he appeared on the show to introduce a performance by Canadian rock band The Tragically Hip. Aykroyd, who is a fan of the band, had personally lobbied Lorne Michaels to book them as musical guests.

During some guest appearances, he resurrected the Blues Brothers musical act with frequent host John Goodman in place of Belushi. He became the second member of the original cast to host SNL in May 2003, when he appeared in the season finale. During his monologue, he performed a musical number with James Belushi similar to the Blues Brothers, but neither Aykroyd nor Belushi donned the black suit and sunglasses. On March 24, 2007, Aykroyd appeared as a crying fan of American Idol finalist Sanjaya Malakar (played by Andy Samberg) during "Weekend Update". On February 14, 2009, he appeared as U.S. House Minority leader John Boehner. Aykroyd also made a surprise guest appearance, along with many other SNL alumni, on the show of March 9, 2013.

The Blues Brothers

Aykroyd was a close friend of John Belushi. According to Aykroyd, their first meeting helped spark the Blues Brothers act. When they met in a club that Aykroyd frequented, he played a blues record in the background, and it stimulated a fascination with blues in Belushi, who was primarily a fan of heavy rock bands at the time. Aykroyd educated Belushi on the finer points of blues music, and with a little encouragement from then-SNL music director Paul Shaffer, it led to the creation of their Blues Brothers characters.

Backed by such experienced professional R&B sidemen as lead guitarist Steve Cropper, sax man Lou Marini, trumpeter Alan Rubin, and bass guitarist Donald "Duck" Dunn, the Blues Brothers proved more than an SNL novelty. Taking off with the public as a legitimate musical act, they performed live gigs and in 1978 released the hit album Briefcase Full of Blues (drawn from the fact that Aykroyd, as "Elwood Blues", carried his blues harmonicas in a briefcase that he kept handcuffed to his wrist, in the manner of a CIA courier; Belushi originally carried the key to those handcuffs). Briefcase Full of Blues eventually sold 3.5 million copies, and is one of the highest-selling blues albums of all time. The band was much further popularized in the 1980 film The Blues Brothers, which Aykroyd co-wrote. A sequel, titled Blues Brothers 2000, was released in 1998 and featured John Goodman as Belushi's replacement.

Cherokee Studios in Los Angeles was a regular haunt for the original Blues Brothers in the early days of the band. Belushi and Aykroyd became fixtures at the recording studio, while fellow Blues Brother Steve Cropper called Cherokee his producing home. Whenever they needed a bass player, they were joined by another Blues Brother, Donald "Duck" Dunn. During this time, Cropper, along with producing partner and Cherokee owner Bruce Robb, worked on a number of music projects with the two comedians/musicians, including Belushi's favourite band, Fear, and later Aykroyd's movie Dragnet.

The Blues Brothers Band continues to tour, both with and without Aykroyd. The band features original members Cropper and Marini, along with vocalist Eddie Floyd. Aykroyd sometimes performs as Elwood, along with Belushi's younger brother Jim Belushi, who plays "Brother Zee" on stage. They are most frequently backed by the Sacred Hearts Band.

Other film and television work

Concurrent with his work in Saturday Night Live, Aykroyd played the role of Purvis Bickle, lift operator at the fictitious office block 99 Sumach Street in the CBC Television series Coming Up Rosie.

After leaving SNL, Aykroyd starred in a number of films, mostly comedies, with uneven results both commercially and artistically. His first three American feature films all co-starred Belushi. The first, 1941 (1979), directed by Steven Spielberg, was a box-office disappointment. The second, The Blues Brothers (1980), which he co-wrote with director John Landis, was a massive hit. The third, Neighbors (1981) had mixed critical reaction, but was another box-office hit. One of his best-received performances was as a blueblood-turned-wretch in the 1983 comedy Trading Places, in which he co-starred with fellow SNL alumnus Eddie Murphy and Jamie Lee Curtis.

In the early 1980s, Aykroyd began work on a script for the film that eventually became Ghostbusters, inspired by his fascination with parapsychology and his belief in ghosts. The script initially included a much greater fantasy element, including time travel, but this was toned down substantially through work on the script with Harold Ramis (who became a co-writer) and director Ivan Reitman. Aykroyd originally wrote the role of Dr. Peter Venkman with Belushi in mind, but rewrote it for Bill Murray after Belushi's death. Aykroyd joked that the green ghost, later known as "Slimer", was "the ghost of John Belushi" and was based on Belushi's party-animal personality.

Aykroyd's next major film role was in the 1985 spy comedy film Spies Like Us, which like The Blues Brothers was co-conceived and co-written by Aykroyd, and directed by Landis. Aykroyd had again intended for Belushi to be the other lead in the film; the part was instead given to SNL alumnus Chevy Chase. The film was intended as an homage to the Bob Hope/Bing Crosby Road to ... movies of the 1940s to 1960s. Bob Hope made a cameo appearance in the film.

Dragnet, in which Aykroyd co-starred (with Tom Hanks) and co-wrote, was released in 1987. The film was both an homage and a satire of the previous Dragnet series, with Aykroyd playing Sgt. Joe Friday as a police officer whose law-and-order attitude is at odds with modern sensibilities.

Aykroyd appeared in five films released in 1988, all of them critical and commercial failures. A sequel to Ghostbusters, Ghostbusters II, was released in 1989; Aykroyd and the other co-creators were reluctant to make another Ghostbusters film, but succumbed to pressure from the film's studio, Columbia Pictures. The film, while considered inferior to the original, was another big hit, earning . Aykroyd was nominated for an Academy Award for Best Supporting Actor for 1989's Driving Miss Daisy. He was the fourth SNL cast member to be nominated for an Oscar, after Joan Cusack, who was the third.

Aykroyd's directorial debut was 1991's Nothing but Trouble starring Demi Moore, Chevy Chase, John Candy, and Aykroyd, sporting a bulbous prosthetic nose. The film was a critical and box-office flop. Aykroyd's other films in the 1990s were mostly similarly poorly received, including Coneheads (also based on a SNL skit), Exit to Eden, Blues Brothers 2000, and Getting Away with Murder. Three exceptions were My Girl (1991), which starred Jamie Lee Curtis, and Macaulay Culkin, Tommy Boy (1995), which starred SNL alumni David Spade and Chris Farley, in which Aykroyd played the role of Ray Zalinsky, and Grosse Pointe Blank (1997), in which Aykroyd had a well-received role as a rival hit man.

In 1994, Aykroyd made a guest appearance in an episode of the sitcom The Nanny as a refrigerator repairman. In 1997, he starred as an Episcopal priest in the ABC sitcom Soul Man, which lasted two seasons. In 1998, Aykroyd voiced the role of Chip, a wasp, in Antz. In 2001, he starred in the Woody Allen film The Curse of the Jade Scorpion. Most of his film roles since then have tended to be small character parts in big-budget productions, such as a signals analyst in Pearl Harbor and a neurologist in 50 First Dates.

In 2009, Aykroyd and Ramis wrote and appeared in Ghostbusters: The Video Game, which also featured Bill Murray, Ernie Hudson, Annie Potts, William Atherton, and Brian Doyle-Murray. In 2010, he played the voice of the title character, Yogi Bear, in the live-action/CGI-animated-film Yogi Bear. That same year, Aykroyd and Chevy Chase guest-starred in the Family Guy episode "Spies Reminiscent of Us", an homage to Spies Like Us.

Aykroyd appeared in two February 2011 episodes of CBS's The Defenders as Judge Max Hunter, which also starred Jim Belushi. He also appeared on Top Chef Canada as a guest judge.

In 2013, Aykroyd voiced the role of Scarecrow in Legends of Oz: Dorothy's Return. In 2015, he appeared in a State Farm insurance commercial along with Jane Curtin and Laraine Newman, as the Coneheads, talking to "Jake", a State Farm agent.

Aykroyd was one of the executive producers of Ghostbusters, a long-discussed reboot of the Ghostbusters franchise, which was released in 2016. Aykroyd had a cameo appearance in the film, along with many of the rest of the original Ghostbusters cast.

In early 2021, he provided the voice of the Postage Stamp Fellow in the episode The Dad-Feelings Limited in the TV series The Simpsons. He also reprised his role of Dr. Ray Stantz in the movie Ghostbusters: Afterlife. Though Sony has not confirmed any further sequels to Afterlife, Aykroyd expressed interest in having the surviving three actors of the original Ghostbusters team continuing to reprise their roles for as many sequels as possible while they were alive.

Other musical endeavours
Aykroyd participated in the recording of "We Are the World" in 1985, as a member of the chorus. He wrote the liner notes for fellow Ottawa-born blues musician JW-Jones's album Bluelisted in 2008. Until its ending in 2018, he hosted the internationally syndicated radio show "Elwood's BluesMobile", formerly known as the House of Blues Radio Hour, under his Blues Brothers moniker Elwood Blues.

Business ventures

In 1992, Aykroyd and Hard Rock Cafe co-founder Isaac Tigrett founded the House of Blues, a chain of music venues, with the mission to promote African-American cultural contributions of blues music and folk art.

Many other music and Hollywood personalities helped to finance it at its start. It began as a single location in Cambridge, Massachusetts, although other locations quickly followed, starting with a venue in New Orleans in 1994. In 2004, House of Blues became the second-largest live music promoter in the world, with seven venues and 22 amphitheatres in the United States and Canada. It was bought by Live Nation in 2006.

On New Year's Eve, 1994, Aykroyd opened the Aykroyd's Ghetto House Cafe on Princess Street in Kingston, Ontario.

In 2007, Aykroyd and artist John Alexander founded Crystal Head Vodka, a brand of high-end vodka known for its distinctive skull-shaped bottle and for being filtered through Herkimer diamond crystals.

Aykroyd is also part owner of several wineries in Canada's Niagara Peninsula, and the company that distributes Patrón tequila in Canada.

In 2016, Aykroyd partnered with TV producers Eric Bischoff and Jason Hervey and game developer Ike McFadden to release an online-casino game that features the Blues Brothers. Aykroyd provided the in-game voice of his Elwood Blues character via voiceover.

Charitable works
In 2009, Aykroyd contributed a series of reminiscences on his upbringing in Canada for a charity album titled Dan Aykroyd's Canada. He helped start the Blue Line Foundation, which is redeveloping flood-damaged lots in New Orleans and helping first responders buy them at reduced prices. Coastal Blue Line LLC, hopes to eventually rebuild 400 properties in New Orleans.

Aykroyd is a member of Canadian charity Artists Against Racism.

Personal life
Aykroyd was briefly engaged to actress Carrie Fisher, proposing to her on the set of The Blues Brothers. In the film, she appeared as a jilted girlfriend of John Belushi's character Jake Blues. Their engagement ended when she reconciled with her former boyfriend, musician Paul Simon. In 1983, Aykroyd married actress Donna Dixon. The couple met on the set of Doctor Detroit released the same year and appeared together in four additional films: Twilight Zone: The Movie (1983); Spies Like Us (1985); The Couch Trip (1988); and Exit to Eden (1994). Together, they have three daughters, including Danielle (known by her stage name, Vera Sola). The couple announced in April 2022 that they were separating after 39 years of marriage, but would remain legally married.

Aykroyd maintains his Canadian roots as a longtime resident of Sydenham, Ontario, with his estate on Loughborough Lake.

In a 2004 NPR interview with host Terry Gross, Aykroyd said that he had been diagnosed in childhood with Tourette syndrome (TS). He stated that his TS was successfully treated with therapy. In 2015, he stated during a HuffPost Show interview with hosts Roy Sekoff and Marc Lamont Hill that he has Asperger syndrome which was "never diagnosed", but was "sort of a self-diagnosis" based on several of his own characteristics.

Aykroyd is a former reserve commander for the police department in Harahan, Louisiana, working for Chief of Police Peter Dale. While on the force, Aykroyd carried his badge with him at all times. He currently serves as a reserve deputy of the Hinds County Sheriff's Department in Hinds County, Mississippi. He supports the reserves with a fundraiser concert along with other blues and gospel singers in Mississippi.

Aykroyd's passions for the outdoors, geology and paleontology, which he attributes to watching his father work on constructing the Gatineau Parkway which included blasting through granite rock formations to run the highway, have led him to join Canadian paleontologist Philip J. Currie on a number of digs, including fundraising digs and galas as fundraisers for the construction of the Philip J. Currie Dinosaur Museum in Wembley, Alberta, which recognized Aykroyd's contributions by naming its theatre the Aykroyd Family Theatre.

Friendship with John Belushi
In an appearance on the Today show, Aykroyd referred to John Belushi and himself as "kindred spirits". In the biography Belushi, Aykroyd claims that Belushi was the only man with whom he could ever dance. Aykroyd and Belushi were scheduled to present the Academy Award for Visual Effects in 1982, but Belushi died only a few weeks prior to the ceremony. Though devastated by his friend's death, Aykroyd presented the award alone, remarking from the stage: "My partner would have loved to have been here to present this, given that he was something of a visual effect himself."

Aykroyd was openly hostile to the 1989 film Wired, a biopic of Belushi which was based on the 1984 book of the same name by journalist Bob Woodward, starred Michael Chiklis in his film debut as Belushi, and featured him as a character played by actor Gary Groomes. Along with Belushi's widow Judith and brother Jim, and many other friends, associates and relatives of Belushi, he boycotted the film and the associated book for misrepresenting Belushi's life, and expressed his desire that the film would flop at the box office, which it ultimately did. During an interview for MTV's The Big Picture in June 1988, he said, "I have witches working now to jinx the thing... I hope it never gets seen and I am going to hurl all the negative energy I can and muster all my hell energies [against them]. My thunderbolts are out on this one, quite truthfully." He had actor J. T. Walsh removed from the film Loose Cannons after Walsh had already done two days of filming in the role of Grimmer, after finding out that Walsh had been in the cast of Wired. Walsh, who had played Bob Woodward in Wired, was replaced as Grimmer by fellow Canadian Paul Koslo, causing the film a $125,000 production delay.

Beliefs
Aykroyd considers himself a Spiritualist, stating:
I am a Spiritualist, a proud wearer of the Spiritualist badge. Mediums and psychic research have gone on for many, many years ... Loads of people have seen spirits, heard a voice, or felt the cold temperature. I believe that they are between here and there, that they exist between the fourth and fifth dimensions, and that they visit us frequently.

Aykroyd's great-grandfather, a dentist, was a mystic who corresponded with author Sir Arthur Conan Doyle on the subject of Spiritualism, and was a member of the Lily Dale Society. Other than Spiritualism, Aykroyd is also interested in various other aspects of the paranormal, particularly UFOlogy. He is a lifetime member of and official Hollywood consultant for the Mutual UFO Network (MUFON). Along these lines, he served, from 1996 to 2000, as host of Psi Factor: Chronicles of the Paranormal, which claimed to describe cases drawn from the archives of "The Office of Scientific Investigation and Research". In 2005, Aykroyd produced the DVD Dan Aykroyd: Unplugged on UFOs.

Aykroyd was interviewed for 80 minutes by UFOlogist David Sereda, discussing in depth many aspects of the UFO phenomenon.

On September 29, 2009, Peter Aykroyd Sr., Dan's father, published a book entitled A History of Ghosts. This book chronicled the family's historical involvement in the Spiritualist movement, to which Aykroyd readily refers. Aykroyd wrote the introduction and accompanied his father on a series of promotional activities, including launches in New York and Toronto, appearances on Larry King Live and Coast to Coast AM, and various other public-relations initiatives. Aykroyd also read the introduction for the audio version of the book. In 1997, the Committee for Skeptical Inquiry  awarded Aykroyd in absentia the Snuffed Candle Award for hosting Psi Factor and being a "long-time promoter ... of paranormal claims". Following the awards, Joe Nickell wrote to Aykroyd asking for the research behind the "cases" presented on Psi Factor, particularly a claim that NASA scientists were "killed while investigating a meteor crash and giant eggs were found and incubated, yielding a flea the size of a hog".

Filmography

Film

Television

Video games

Guest appearances on SNL

Awards and nominations

In 1977, Aykroyd received an Emmy Award for Outstanding Writing in a Comedy-Variety or Music Series for his collaborative work on Saturday Night Live. In 1994, he received an honorary Doctor of Literature degree from Carleton University. In 1999, Aykroyd was made a Member of the Order of Canada. He was inducted into Canada's Walk of Fame in 2002. In 2017, he was made a member of the Order of Ontario in recognition for being "one of the world's most popular entertainers, well-known for his time on Saturday Night Live and the 1984 classic movie Ghostbusters."

See also
 List of Canadian actors
 List of celebrities who own wineries and vineyards
 Saturday Night Live cast members

References

Further reading
Hill, Doug, and Weingrad, Jeff, Saturday Night: A Backstage History of Saturday Night Live. Vintage Books, 1986. .

External links

 
 
 Dan Aykroyd, Still Full of the 'Blues' – interview on NPR's Fresh Air with Terry Gross – originally aired November 22, 2004

 
1952 births
20th-century American comedians
20th-century American male actors
20th-century Canadian comedians
20th-century Canadian male actors
20th-century Canadian male writers
20th-century Canadian writers
21st-century American comedians
21st-century American male actors
21st-century Canadian comedians
21st-century Canadian male actors
American impressionists (entertainers)
American male comedians
American male film actors
American male television actors
American male television writers
American male voice actors
American people of Dutch descent
American people of English descent
American people of French-Canadian descent
American people of Irish descent
American people of Scottish descent
American police officers
American male screenwriters
American sketch comedians
American spiritualists
American television personalities
Male television personalities
American television writers
Audiobook narrators
Businesspeople from Ottawa
Canadian conspiracy theorists
Canadian emigrants to the United States
Canadian impressionists (entertainers)
Canadian male comedians
Canadian male film actors
Canadian male television actors
Canadian male voice actors
Canadian people of Dutch descent
Canadian people of English descent
Canadian people of French descent
Canadian people of Irish descent
Canadian people of Scottish descent
Canadian male screenwriters
Canadian sketch comedians
Canadian spiritualists
Canadian television personalities
Canadian television writers
Carleton University alumni
Comedians from Ontario
Living people
Male actors from Ottawa
Members of the Order of Canada
Members of the Order of Ontario
People from Harahan, Louisiana
People with Tourette syndrome
Primetime Emmy Award winners
The Blues Brothers members
Ufologists
UFO conspiracy theorists
Writers from Ottawa